Hammond High School was a public secondary school located in the Northwestern Indiana city of Hammond. Part of the School City of Hammond district, it opened in 1884 and graduated its final class in the spring of 2021.

History
Hammond High School was established in 1884. The building that would be the final Hammond High campus opened in 1915 as the Hammond Industrial High School.

The school caught fire on December 13, 1967. In the aftermath of the fire, students shared the campus of Hammond Tech, attending classes in the afternoon while Hammond Tech students went to class in the morning. Reconstruction after the fire was not completed until 1973.

Academic performance
The early 2000s saw Hammond High School placed on probationary accreditation status from the Indiana Department of Education. The school consistently underperformed on the ISTEP exams beginning in 2000–01. The pass rates for Hammond students on the 2008–09 exams was 32.8%; the statewide average was 73.7%. In, the Graduation rate was 57.3%.

Extracurricular activities

Academic Super Bowl Team
Bible Club
Chess Club
Debate Team
Environmental Club
Mock Trial
Gamers club
Drama Club
Key Club
National Honor Society
Natural Helpers 
Science Olympiad
Spanish Club
Student Government

Athletics

Fall sports
Football
Volleyball
Boys' Soccer
Girls' Soccer
Cross Country

Winter sports
Boys' Basketball
Girls' Basketball
Swimming
Wrestling

Spring sports
Baseball
Golf
Softball
Girls' Tennis
Track

State championships
The Hammond Wildcats won the following IHSAA championships during their century-plus of competition:

 1905 Boys Track & Field
 1906 Boys Track & Field
 1935 Wrestling
 1936 Wrestling
 1936 Boys Swimming & Diving
 1937 Wrestling
 1938 Boys Track & Field
 1939 Boys Track & Field
 1940 Boys Swimming & Diving
 1941 Boys Swimming & Diving
 1942 Boys Swimming & Diving
 1943 Boys Swimming & Diving
 1951 Boys Swimming & Diving
 1952 Boys Swimming & Diving
 1954 Boys Swimming & Diving
 1962 Wrestling
 1962 Football  
 1963 Wrestling

Notable alumni
 Bob Anderson – former MLB player for the Detroit Tigers and Chicago Cubs
 Don Brumm – former defensive lineman for the Purdue Boilermakers football team. Former NFL player for the  St. Louis Cardinals and Philadelphia Eagles
 Rudy Chapa – Decorated at the high school and collegiate level for track and field. Member of the Board of Trustees of the University of Oregon until 2017
 Jack Chevigny - Notre Dame football player, University of Texas head football coach, United States Marine killed at Iwo Jima in WWII. 
 Irv Cross – former NFL cornerback for the Philadelphia Eagles and Los Angeles Rams. Former host of The NFL Today on CBS
 Dory Funk – former professional wrestler
 Bob Livingstone – former All-America Football Conference halfback for the Chicago Rockets and Buffalo Bills. Former NFL halfback for the Baltimore Colts and the Chicago Cardinals
 Jean Shepherd – Writer and narrator of A Christmas Story
 Chips Sobek – former NBA player for the Sheboygan Red Skins
 Frank Radovich - former professional basketball player for the St. Louis Hawks and Philadelphia Warriors, member of the Indiana High School Basketball Hall of Fame

See also
 List of high schools in Indiana

References

External links

Official website

Public high schools in Indiana
Schools in Lake County, Indiana
1884 establishments in Indiana
2021 disestablishments in Indiana